At the 1998 Commonwealth Games, the athletics events were held at the National Stadium, Bukit Jalil, in Kuala Lumpur, Malaysia from the 16–21 September 1998.

Medal summary

Men

Women

Medal table

Participation

References
Official results
Archived athletics results from official website
Finals results

 
1998
Commonwealth Games
1998 Commonwealth Games events